Henning Jensen (1949–2017) was a Danish football striker, who played 21 national team games.

Henning Jensen may also refer to:

Henning Gronemann (born Henning Jensen, 1929–2016), Danish football striker, who played one national team game
Henning Jensen (footballer, born 1910)
Henning G. Jensen (born 1950)
Henning Munk Jensen (born 1947), Danish football defender, who played 62 national team games
Henning Jensen (actor) (born 1943), Danish actor